The Nickel Boys is an upcoming American period drama film written and directed by RaMell Ross and based on the 2019 novel of the same name by Colson Whitehead. It stars Aunjanue Ellis, Ethan Herisse, Fred Hechinger, Hamish Linklater and Brandon Wilson.

Premise
The Nickel Boys is based on the historic reform school in 1960s Florida called the Dozier School for Boys, which was notorious for abusive treatment of students. 

The film explores the story of Elwood Curtis, a young African-American boy who is sent to the Nickel Academy, a fictional version of the Dozier School, after he is falsely accused of a crime. While there, he meets a boy named Turner, and the two form a close friendship as they try to survive the horrors of the school and its corrupt administrators.

Cast
 Aunjanue Ellis
 Ethan Herisse
 Fred Hechinger
 Hamish Linklater
 Brandon Wilson

Production
The adaptation of Colson Whitehead's 2019 novel, The Nickel Boys, into a feature film was announced in October 2020, with RaMell Ross serving as director and Joslyn Barnes as producer. Whitehead was the executive producer, and Aunjanue Ellis, Ethan Herisse, Fred Hechinger, Hamish Linklater, and Brandon Wilson were cast in the film.

Principal photography began in October 2022 and wrapped in December of the same year.  Filming took place in Louisiana in LaPlace, New Orleans, Hammond and Ponchatoula.  The office building of the Lafourche Parish District Attorney was used as a filming location in  Thibodaux in early December.

References

External links
 

Upcoming films
Films based on novels
Films shot in Louisiana
Drama films based on actual events
American films based on actual events
Orion Pictures films
Plan B Entertainment films
Anonymous Content films
Metro-Goldwyn-Mayer films